is a fictional character and the titular protagonist of the video game franchise of the same name. Created by Toru Iwatani, he first appeared in the arcade game Pac-Man (1980), and has since appeared in more than 30 licensed sequels and spin-offs for multiple platforms, and spawning mass amounts of merchandise in his image, including two television series and a hit single by Buckner & Garcia. He is the official mascot of Bandai Namco Entertainment. Pac-Man's most common antagonists are the Ghost Gang — Blinky, Pinky, Inky and Clyde that are determined to defeat him to accomplish their goals, which change throughout the series. Pac-Man also has a voracious appetite, being able to consume vast amounts of food in a short timespan, and can eat his enemies by consuming large "Power Pellets".

The idea of Pac-Man was taken from both the image of a pizza with a slice removed and from rounding out the Japanese symbol "kuchi", meaning "mouth". The character was made to be cute and colorful to appeal to younger players, particularly women. In Japan, he was originally titled "Puckman" for his hockey puck-like shape, which was changed in international releases to prevent defacement of the arcade cabinets by changing the P into an F. Pac-Man has the highest-brand awareness of any video game character in North America, becoming an icon in video games and pop culture. He is credited as the first video game mascot character and the first to receive merchandise. He also appears as a playable character in the Super Smash Bros. series, specifically in the forth and fifth installments.

Character design
Pac-Man's origins are debated. According to the character's creator Toru Iwatani, the inspiration was pizza without a slice, which gave him a vision of "an animated pizza, racing through a maze and eating things with its absent-slice mouth". However, he said in a 1986 interview that the design of the character also came from simplifying and rounding out the Japanese character for a mouth, kuchi (口). The character's name was originally written in English as "Puck-Man", but when Namco localized the game for the United States they changed it to "Pac-Man", fearing that vandals would change the P in "Puck" to an F.

The arcade created an official art on the original Puck-Man designed by Namco Artist Tadashi Yamashita, portrayed him as a yellow circle with a large mouth as well as hands, feet, eyes and a long nose. The North American Pac-Man artwork by Midway, went a different way and depicted him as a yellow circle with legs and large red eyes. In-game Pac-Man was represented as a two-dimensional sprite of a simple yellow circle with a mouth, which is his current design as of 2018. 1984's Pac-Land was the first game (of many) to use his arcade art in-game. More recently Pac-Man appears as a full three-dimensional polygonal model. His design went through two minor changes from the Puck-Man cabinet art over the years, the first made his nose smaller in the 1990s and the second altered his eyes and shoes in 2010.

Appearances

In video games

Pac-Man first appeared in the original action game of the same name. Despite Pac-Mans legacy, Pac-Man himself did not appear again until the 1982 arcade release of Super Pac-Man, which introduced a change into Super Pac-Man (Pac-Man increased in size and invulnerability). Later arcade games include Pac-Land, Pac-Mania and Pac-Man Arrangement, a remake of the original Pac-Man. Pac-Man World was released in 1999 on the PlayStation, and introduced new abilities to him (reminiscent to Mario's and Sonic the Hedgehog's abilities). The game contributed heavily to the series as well as the character and spawned two sequels, a spin-off and a remake as well. Pac-Man World 2 features Pac-Man on an adventure to rescue Pac-Land from an ancient spirit known as Spooky. Pac-Man World 3 was released in 2005 to celebrate Pac-Man's 25th anniversary. In Pac 'n Roll, a young Pac-Man is being trained by the great Pac-Master.

Several spin-offs have been released, such as a racing game Pac-Man World Rally. Midway Games established a spin-off titled Ms. Pac-Man (featuring Pac-Man's wife of the same name), which was created without Namco's consent. Pac-Man appears in Street Fighter X Tekken as a playable guest fighter, riding a giant Mokujin robot, and in Everybody's Golf 6 as a playable guest golfer (through DLC). Pac-Man has also appeared in all three Mario Kart Arcade GP installments as a playable racer along with Ms. Pac-Man (first two Mario Kart Arcade GP installments only).

Pac-Man is also a playable character in Super Smash Bros. for Nintendo 3DS and Wii U, co-developed by Sora Ltd. and Bandai Namco Games. Sporting his classic design used in artwork for the original game and in the Pac-Man World games, Pac-Man's moveset is based around early Pac-Man games and various other Namco arcade titles, such as deploying a Power Pellet and dashing after it, summoning fire hydrants from Pac-Land, or jumping on the trampoline from Mappy. An Amiibo figure based on his appearance also allows Pac-Man elements to appear in compatible Nintendo titles, such as Mario Kart 8 and Super Mario Maker. Pac-Man returns as a playable character in Super Smash Bros. Ultimate.

Other appearances
"Pac-Man Fever", a hit single named after the character, reached number nine on the Billboard Hot 100 in the United States in March 1982 and was certified Gold by the RIAA that same month. In the late 2000s, a feature film was reported to be in development. The character was the main mascot of the children's play area Pac-Man Land which was located in Six Flags Over Texas from 1983 to 1985, before it was changed to Looney Tunes Land.

Pac-Man starred in the 1982–1983 Pac-Man cartoon voiced by Marty Ingels. In the series, Pac-Man works to keep Mezmaron and the Ghost Monsters from finding the Power Pellet Forest.

Pac-Man also starred in the 2013-2015 computer-generated animated series Pac-Man and the Ghostly Adventures, voiced by Erin Mathews. The series revolves around a teenage Pac-Man (aka Pacster or Pac), who protects Pac-World from ghosts alongside his high school friends.

The character has made numerous cameo appearances in various television cartoon series and movies, including Tron, Tiny Toon Adventures (episodes "Gang Buster's" and "Buster and Babs Go Hawaiian"), The Simpsons (episode "Homer and Ned's Hail Mary Pass"), Futurama (episode "Anthology of Interest II" voiced by David Herman), South Park (episode "Imaginationland Episode III"), Drawn Together (episodes "Gay Bash" and "Nipple Ring-Ring Goes to Foster Care"), Family Guy (episodes "Stuck Together, Torn Apart", "Stewie Griffin: The Untold Story", and "Candy, Quahog Marshmallow"), Annoying Orange (episode "Pacmania"), Robot Chicken (episodes "Tubba-Bubba's Now Hubba-Hubba" and "Fool's Goldfinger"), Mad, Guardians of the Galaxy Vol. 2, Wreck-It Ralph, and its sequel Ralph Breaks the Internet.

Pac-Man also appears, in a larger role (including being prominently featured in promotional posters), in the 2015 film Pixels among the arcade game characters that the aliens unleash as monsters upon Earth. His creator Tōru Iwatani also appears in the movie as an Electric Dreams Factory Arcade repairman while Denis Akiyama portrays the film's Tōru Iwatani, who tries to reason with Pac-Man only to get his right arm pixelated upon it being bitten by Pac-Man.

In Japan, the 2016 tokusatsu film Kamen Rider Heisei Generations: Dr. Pac-Man vs. Ex-Aid & Ghost with Legend Riders features Pac-Man, as well as a villain character named Dr. Pac-Man portrayed by Shirō Sano. A transformation based on Pac-Man also appears in the Kamen Rider Ex-Aid side series, Kamen Rider Genm.

In August 2022, a live-action CGI Pac-Man film was announced as being in development by Wayfarer Studios.

Reception

Since the release of Pac-Man in 1980, Pac-Man has become a social phenomenon and became an icon of the video game industry, as well as popular culture. According to the Davie-Brown Index (DBI), Pac-Man has the highest brand awareness of any video game character among American consumers, recognized by 94 percent of them (surpassing Mario and Sonic). Mario creator Shigeru Miyamoto even stated that Pac-Man was his favorite video game character. Pac-Man was the first character inducted at Twin Galaxies' International Video Game Hall of Fame in 2010. In 2011, readers of Guinness World Records Gamer's Edition voted Pac-Man as the 6th-top video game character of all time. In 2012, GamesRadar ranked him as the 73rd "most memorable, influential, and badass" protagonist in games, commenting: "Toru Iwatani's simple, iconic, timeless character design has seen Pac-Man endure for more than 30 years and become an established visual shorthand for gaming and gaming culture all over the world."  Jeremy Parish of Polygon ranked 73 fighters from Super Smash Bros. Ultimate "from garbage to glorious", listing Pacman as second, and praising by saying "He's the ultimate good sport, there to lend the whole affair a little extra gravitas and unconcerned with the outcome. So long as everyone’s having a good time, Pac-Man feels content that his involvement in Smash is time well spent." Gavin Jasper of Den of Geek ranked Pacman as 35th of Super Smash Bros. Ultimate characters and criticized by stating that "Pac-Man as an actual character is something that shouldn’t be. We aren’t meant to comprehend him and any attempts to give him an identity have always been too strange to exist. Pac-Man breaks reality." Ravi Sinha of GamingBolt included Pac-man with his appearance at Pac-Land on his "Worst Video Game Character Designs That Were Totally Disliked By Gamers", criticizing and stated that "Of all the characters that needed a redesign, Pac Man should not have even been considered. Regardless, Namco thought it was a good idea to give Pac-Man legs. And a weird hat with a feather. In Pac-Land, things went even further as he received a Pinocchio-like nose as well. You really have to wonder which generation Namco was trying to appeal to here." HobbyConsolas also included Pac-Man on their "The 30 best heroes of the last 30 years." In 2017, Time named Pac-Man as 13th on their "Most Influential Video Game Characters of All Time", stating that "His first arcade appearance in 1980 said nothing about the character, save an implicit, voracious need to gobble things. He chomped his way into gamers’ hearts anyway, sending a message to future designers: that a distinctive, easily recognizable protagonist wed to a dead simple play concept can go miles toward making something a hit."

Cultural impact
The term "Pac-Man defense" in mergers and acquisitions refers to a hostile takeover target that attempts to reverse the situation and take over its would-be acquirer instead, a reference to Pac-Man's Power Pellets. Filipino boxer Manny Pacquiao was nicknamed "Pac-Man", as was American football player Adam Jones.

Notes

References
https://www.gonbcnews.com/pacman-30th-anniversar/

Mascots introduced in 1980
Corporate mascots
Video game mascots
Toy mascots
Male characters in advertising
Male characters in video games
Namco protagonists
Pac-Man
Super Smash Bros. fighters
Video game characters introduced in 1980